The following lists events that happened during 1994 in Burundi.

Incumbents
President:
acting until February 5: Sylvie Kinigi
February 5-April 6: Cyprien Ntaryamira
starting April 6: Sylvestre Ntibantunganya
Prime Minister: Sylvie Kinigi (until February 5), Anatole Kanyenkiko (starting February 5)

Events

April
 April 6 - The airplane carrying Rwandan President Juvénal Habyarimana and Burundian President Cyprien Ntaryamira was shot down as it prepared to land in Kigali. This was the major cause for the Rwandan genocide in Rwanda.

References

 
Years of the 20th century in Burundi
1990s in Burundi
Burundi
Burundi